Massimo Chessa (born April 30, 1988 in Sassari) is a professional Italian basketball player for Dinamo Sassari in the Italian Lega Basket Serie A (LBA). Standing at 188 cm (6 ft 2 in), he plays as point guard or shooting guard.

References

External links
 Profile at Foxsportspulse.com

1988 births
Living people
Auxilium Pallacanestro Torino players
Dinamo Sassari players
Guards (basketball)
Italian men's basketball players
Pallacanestro Biella players
Pallacanestro Trapani players
Pallacanestro Virtus Roma players
Scaligera Basket Verona players